is a former Japanese football player and manager.

Playing career
Morishita was born in Kainan, Wakayama on September 21, 1972. After graduating from Juntendo University, he joined Gamba Osaka in 1995. He became a regular player from 1996. However his opportunity to play decreased in 2001 and he moved to Consadole Sapporo in July 2001. Although he played as regular player, the club was relegated to J2 League from 2003. In 2004, he moved to Júbilo Iwata, but he could hardly play in matches and he retired at the end of the 2005 season.

Coaching career
After retirement, Morishita started coaching at Júbilo Iwata in 2006. He coached the youth team from 2006 to 2007 and the top team from 2008 to 2011. In 2012, he became the manager of the club, but due to bad club results, he was sacked in May 2013 when the club was at 17th place out of 18 clubs. In 2014, he signed with J2 League club Kyoto Sanga FC and became a coach. In June, manager Badu was sacked and Morishita managed the club in 2 matches as caretaker until the club signed with a new manager, Ryoichi Kawakatsu. In 2015, he moved to Sagan Tosu and managed the club for the season. In 2017, he signed with J2 club Thespakusatsu Gunma. However the club finished at the bottom place in 2017 and was relegated to J3 League. He resigned at the end of the 2017 season. In 2019, he signed with his old club Gamba Osaka and he became the manager for Gamba Osaka U-23.

Club statistics

Managerial statistics
Update; December 31, 2018

References

External links
 
 

1972 births
Living people
Juntendo University alumni
Association football people from Wakayama Prefecture
Japanese footballers
J1 League players
J2 League players
Gamba Osaka players
Hokkaido Consadole Sapporo players
Júbilo Iwata players
Japanese football managers
J1 League managers
J2 League managers
J3 League managers
Júbilo Iwata managers
Kyoto Sanga FC managers
Sagan Tosu managers
Thespakusatsu Gunma managers
Gamba Osaka U-23 managers
Association football midfielders
People from Kainan, Wakayama